Barbeque 67 was a music event held in the market town of Spalding, Lincolnshire, in the East Midlands of England. Despite the presence of many well-known artists among its lineup, the event remains largely unknown. It is considered by some to have been the first rock festival.

Inception
Towards the end of 1966, Grantham promoter, former footballer Brian Thompson, set about booking Geno Washington and the Ram Jam Band and The Move. Their management persuaded Thompson to also book three relatively unknown acts at that time, being Pink Floyd, The Jimi Hendrix Experience and Cream. 
The event was held in Spalding at the tulip bulb auction hall, most likely the largest building in the area that could hold a large crowd. In addition, Zoot Money's Big Roll Band were booked along with a local covers outfit, Sounds Force 5, who were booked to ensure a decent turnout and were to perform in all changeovers between each band at the side of the stage.
Advertising was national and massively underestimated, with thousands making their way to the market town causing national radio to warn travellers to turn back. Attendance numbers have been estimated with a venue capacity of 6,000 and twice as many unable to gain entry. Tickets cost just £1 and covered accommodation came in the form of the Spalding Town F.C. stand next door.

Lineup
Geno Washington And The Ram Jam Band
Zoot Money And His Big Roll Band
Cream (Setlist: NSU, Sunshine of Your Love, We're Going Wrong, Stepping Out, Rollin' and Tumblin', Toad, I'm So Glad)
Jimi Hendrix Experience
Move
Pink Floyd
Sounds Force 5 (between all bands)

The show
The Spring Bank Holiday was sunny and hot, which would have been very uncomfortable in a large crowd inside a metal shed. The event appeared to be unorganised and the sound terrible. Whilst the venue at the start for Pink Floyd was bare, this quickly became overfull with fans being trapped underneath the stage. The two bands grouped under Psychedelic started, Pink Floyd and The Move, followed by the two Blues Rock groups, Jimi Hendrix and Cream. Pink Floyd performed at the rear of the venue using a white bed sheet to project moving images. Hendrix had many issues, including tuning problems, was late on stage, meaning only a half-hour set, and finished by setting fire to his guitar and trashing his speaker stack. It was widely agreed that Clapton out-played Hendrix that day and that Geno Washington made a great show.

Legacy

Whilst a groundbreaking event for its time in the Summer of Love ahead of the famous Monterey Pop Festival and possibly the first Rock music festival in the UK, the event remains largely unknown outside of its home.

The event became a one off in Spalding due to opposition from local residents. Thompson, however, moved to a location in nearby Whittlesey, Cambridgeshire, for the 1968 event, Barn Barbeque Concert and Dance, which included Donovan, Fairport Convention, Fleetwood Mac and The Move.

In 2009 the event was featured in the BBC TV programme Inside Out.
In 2016 a blue plaque commemorated the event, placed at the Red Lion Hotel where Jimi Hendrix resided that night.

The 50th anniversary of the event is to be commemorated in the town at The Punchbowl with a Jimi Hendrix Experience tribute band and local covers groups.

The event is the subject of a 2017 play, Barbecue ’67 Revisited, based on the concert by the Nottingham-based theatre group 'Excavate'.

A radio play Barbeque 67 - The Original Summer of Love, written by Andy Barrett, was broadcast on BBC Radio 4 on 29 May 2022. The programme included reminiscences from Geno Washington, Zoot Money and Nick Mason.

References

 

Rock festivals in England
Pink Floyd concert tours
Cream (band)
Jimi Hendrix
The Move
Spalding, Lincolnshire